Adam Schultz (born ) is an American photographer and the chief official White House photographer for the presidency of Joe Biden.

Career 
Schultz worked for the Clinton Foundation in New York City from 2007 until 2013. He served as a photographer for Hillary Clinton's 2016 presidential campaign. He then joined Biden's team in April 2019, after the former vice president began running for the Democratic nomination, serving as the lead photographer for Biden's 2020 presidential campaign. President Biden offered Schultz access to both public and private moments on the campaign trail and offered his own input and suggestions.

In his White House role, Schultz leads a team of seven people. He uses Sony α9 II cameras.

Personal life 
Schultz is from Atlanta, Georgia, and is a graduate of Georgia State University. A self-described "car nut", he worked as an auto mechanic while at college.

Besides some high school and college classes, he did not study photography full-time.

See also 

 Lawrence Jackson (photographer of Biden's vice president, Kamala Harris)

References

External links

White House photographers
21st-century American photographers
Biden administration personnel
Living people
Year of birth missing (living people)
Place of birth missing (living people)
Georgia State University alumni